FF3 may refer to:
Mozilla Firefox 3 
Fatal Frame III, a 2005 survival horror game for the PlayStation 2
Fatal Fury 3, a 1995 competitive fighting game for the Neo-Geo
Final Fantasy III, a 1990 console role-playing game for the Family Computer
Final Fantasy VI, retitled Final Fantasy III in North America, a 1994 console role-playing game for the Super NES
Final Fight 3, a 1995 side-scrolling action game for the Super NES
The Fast and the Furious: Tokyo Drift, a 2006 film.
Freedom Flotilla III, a maritime activism project regarding the blockade of the Gaza Strip
Fantastic Four, a 2015 film and the third film in the Fantastic Four franchise.